The Half Chance Iron Bridge, also known as the Half-Chance Bridge, is a historic single-span wrought iron bridge located near the small community of Half Chance, between the towns of Linden and Dayton in rural Marengo County, Alabama.  It is on Marengo County Road 39 over Chickasaw Bogue Creek.  The bridge is the oldest surviving iron bridge in Alabama, making it an important transportation and engineering landmark for the state.

County Road 39 has been moved over the years. The Half Chance Iron Bridge is approximately 1/4 mi. to the South and on private property.

It was built by the King Iron Bridge Manufacturing Company of Cleveland, Ohio in 1880. King Iron Bridge Manufacturing Company was founded in 1871 by Zenas King. As early as 1878 it was manufacturing many types of truss, combination, and wooden bridges and by the 1880s it was the largest highway bridge work in the United States.

The bridge was reported as destroyed in a flood between 2008 and 2012. The structure no longer exists.

References

National Register of Historic Places in Marengo County, Alabama
Bridges completed in 1880
Wrought iron bridges in the United States
King Bridge Company
Road bridges on the National Register of Historic Places in Alabama
Tied arch bridges in the United States
Transportation buildings and structures in Marengo County, Alabama